Hilarion the Great (291–371) was an anchorite who spent most of his life in the desert according to the example of Anthony the Great (c. 251–356). While St Anthony is considered to have established Christian monasticism in the Egyptian desert, St Hilarion is considered by some to be the founder of Palestinian monasticism and venerated as a saint by the Orthodox and the Roman Catholic Church.

Early life
The chief source of information regarding Hilarion is the biography written by St. Jerome. "The life of Hilarion was written by Jerome in 390 at Bethlehem. Its object was to further the ascetic life to which he was devoted. It contains, amidst much that is legendary, some statements which attach it to genuine history, and is in any case a record of the state of the human mind in the 4th century."
 

Hilarion was born in Thabatha, south of Gaza in Syria Palaestina of pagan parents. He successfully studied rhetoric with a grammarian in Alexandria. It seems that he was converted to Christianity in Alexandria. After that, he shunned the pleasures of his day—theatre, circus and arena—and spent his time attending church. According to St. Jerome, he was a thin and delicate youth of fragile health.

Beginnings of monastic life
After hearing of Saint Anthony, whose name (according to St. Jerome), "was in the mouth of all the races of Egypt", Hilarion, at the age of fifteen, went to live with him in the desert for two months. As Anthony's hermitage was busy with visitors seeking cures for diseases or demonic affliction, Hilarion returned home along with some monks. At Thabatha, his parents having died in the meantime, he gave his inheritance to his brothers and the poor and left for the wilderness.

Time at Majoma

Hilarion went to the area southwest of Majoma, the port of Gaza, that was limited by the sea at one side and marshland on the other. Because the district was notorious for brigandage, and his relatives and friends warned him of the danger he was incurring, it was his practice never to abide long in the same place. With him he took only a shirt of coarse linen, a cloak of skins given to him by St. Anthony, and a coarse blanket. He led a nomadic life, and he fasted rigorously, not partaking of his frugal meal until after sunset. He supported himself by weaving baskets.

Hilarion lived a life of hardship and simplicity in the desert, where he also experienced spiritual dryness that included temptations to despair. Beset by carnal thoughts, he fasted even more. He was "so wasted that his bones scarcely held together" (Jerome). According to St. Jerome:

He finally built a hut of reeds and sedges at the site of modern-day Deir al-Balah, in which he lived for four years. Afterwards, he constructed a tiny low-ceilinged cell, "a tomb rather than a house", where he slept on a bed of rushes, and recited the Bible or sang hymns. He never washed his clothes, changed them only when they fell apart, and shaved his hair only once a year. He was once visited by robbers, but they left him alone when they learned that he did not fear death (and had nothing worth stealing, anyway).

Saint Jerome described Hilarion's diet as a half a pint of lentils moistened with cold water, and after three years he switched to dry bread with salt and water. Eventually, perceiving his sight to grow dim and his body to be subject to an itching with an unnatural roughness, he added a little oil to this diet.

After he had lived in the wilderness for 22 years, he became quite famous in Syria Palaestina. Visitors started to come, begging for his help. The parade of petitioners and would-be disciples drove Hilarion to retire to more remote locations. But they followed him everywhere. First he visited Anthony's retreat in Egypt. Then he withdrew to Sicily, later to Dalmatia, and finally to Cyprus. He died there in 371.

Miracles
Miracles were attributed to him. His first miracle was when he cured a woman from Eleutheropolis (a Roman city in Syria Palaestina) who had been barren for 15 years. Later, he cured three children of a fatal illness, healed a paralysed charioteer, and expelled demons.

Monastery

In time, a monastery grew around his cell, which was so beset by visitors, especially females, that Hilarion fled.

Novelization
Hermann Hesse adapted a biography of St. Hilarion as one of the three Lives of Joseph Knecht, making up his Nobel Prize–winning novel The Glass Bead Game (also known as Magister Ludi).

See also
Chariton the Confessor (end of 3rd century - c. 350), also considered to be the founder of Palestinian monasticism
Euthymius the Great (377–473), founder of monasteries in Palestine and saint
Paul of Thebes (c. 226/7-c. 341), known as "Paul, the First Hermit", who preceded both Anthony and Chariton
Sabbas the Sanctified (439–532), monk and saint, founded several monasteries in Palestine
Saint Hilarion Castle in Templos, Cyprus. Known in Turkish as "101 houses" (legends of Cyprus). Named for unconnected obscure saint.

References

External links
The life of St. Hilarion
 
Colonnade Statue in St Peter's Square

291 births
371 deaths
3rd-century Romans
4th-century Romans
4th-century Christian saints
Burials in Cyprus
Exorcists
Desert Fathers